The 1995–96 season was the 90th season in the existence of AJ Auxerre and the club's 16th consecutive season in the top-flight of French football. In addition to the domestic league, Auxerre participated in this season's editions of the Coupe de France, the Coupe de la Ligue and UEFA Cup.

Season summary
Auxerre won Division 1 for the first time in their history, and also won the Coupe de France.

First team squad
Squad at end of season

Left club during season

Reserve squad

Squad statistics

Competitions

Division 1

League table

Results summary

Results by round

Matches

Coupe de France

Coupe de la Ligue

UEFA Cup

First round

Second round

Transfers

In

Out

Loans in

Loans out

References

AJ Auxerre seasons
AJ Auxerre
French football championship-winning seasons